Cirque is an album by ambient musician Biosphere, which was released in 2000.

Miss Kittin used "Le Grand Dôme" on her mix album A Bugged Out Mix.

Cirque is dedicated to the memory of Christopher McCandless.

Track listing 
 "Nook and Cranny" – 4:02
 "Le Grand Dôme" – 5:36
 "Grandiflora" – 0:48
 "Black Lamb and Grey Falcon" – 5:08
 "Miniature Rock Dwellers" – 1:04
 "When I Leave" – 5:54
 "Iberia Eterea" – 6:38
 "Moistened & Dried" – 2:25
 "Algae & Fungi Part I" – 5:43
 "Algae & Fungi Part II" – 5:17
 "Too Fragile to Walk On" – 4:51

Trivia 

The sample used in "When I Leave" comes from the documentary Jupiter's Wife by Michel Negroponte (1995).

References 

2000 albums
Biosphere (musician) albums
Touch Music albums